Bony is a 2021 Indian Bengali-language sci-fi thriller film directed by Parambrata Chatterjee, starring Koel Mullick, Anjan Dutt, and Chatterjee. The film is a screen adaptation of the eponymous novel written by Bengali novelist Shirshendu Mukhopadhyay and is produced by Nishpal Singh under the banner of Surinder Films. The film was shot in Tuscany, Italy.

Synopsis
The story of the film revolves around a Bengali couple, settled in Milan. Their newborn son Bony has some special powers. An America-born Bangladeshi on the run scientist, framed by the government with suspected links to terrorism, is looking for the couple and their newborn. He thinks they have answers to his questions.

Cast 
 Parambrata Chatterjee as Bony's father, Sabyasachi
 Koel Mallick as Bony's mother, Pratibha
 Anjan Dutt  as Saukat Osman, a scientist
 Marco Brinzi as Spia italiana
 Zachary Coffin as Petrov
 Giada Benedetti as Doctor
 Deepak Halder
 Kanchan Mallick as Rammohan

Soundtrack

Release 
The film released theatrically on 10 October 2021 coinciding the Puja holidays.

References

External links
 

2021 films
Bengali-language Indian films
Film productions suspended due to the COVID-19 pandemic
Indian science fiction thriller films
Films based on Indian novels
Films shot in Italy
Films shot in Tuscany
2020s Bengali-language films
Films shot in Kolkata
Films based on works by Shirshendu Mukhopadhyay
Films scored by Anupam Roy